Ernest I, Prince of Anhalt-Dessau (died Dessau, 12 June 1516), was a German prince of the House of Ascania and ruler of the principality of Anhalt-Dessau. He was the second son of George I, Prince of Anhalt-Dessau, yet the first born by his fourth wife Anna, daughter of Albert VIII, Count of Lindow-Ruppin.

Life
In 1473, after the death of his father, Ernest inherited the principality of Anhalt-Dessau alongside his younger brothers George II, Sigismund III, and Rudolph IV. Following the family law of the House of Ascania, the accession took place without any division of territories.

The deaths of Sigismund III in 1487, George II in 1509, and Rudolph IV in 1510 without surviving male issue left Ernest as the sole ruler of Anhalt-Dessau until his death.

Marriage and issue
In Cottbus on 20 January 1494 Ernest married Margarete (b. Breslau, 25 August 1473 – d. Dessau, 28 June 1530), daughter of Henry I, Duke of Münsterberg-Oels, and granddaughter of George of Poděbrady, King of Bohemia. They had four sons:
Thomas (b. Dessau, 27 November 1503 – d. 1503).
John V, Prince of Anhalt-Dessau, later Anhalt-Zerbst (b. Dessau, 4 September 1504 – d. Zerbst, 4 February 1551).
George III, Prince of Anhalt-Dessau, later Anhalt-Plötzkau (b. Dessau, 15 August 1507 – d. Dessau, 17 October 1553).
Joachim I, Prince of Anhalt-Dessau (b. Dessau, 7 August 1509 – d. Dessau, 6 December 1561).

Princes of Anhalt-Dessau
House of Ascania
1516 deaths
Year of birth unknown